Teragra clarior is a moth in the family Cossidae. It is found in Cameroon.

References

Natural History Museum Lepidoptera generic names catalog

Endemic fauna of Cameroon
Metarbelinae
Moths described in 1929